Toronto Shooting Stars were a Canadian professional indoor lacrosse team that played in the Canadian Lacrosse League. The Shooting Stars played out of the Mattamy Athletic Centre in Toronto, Ontario.

History

The team was founded as the Oshawa Machine in the summer of 2011.

The Machine played their first game in franchise history on January 7, 2012 in Hagersville, Ontario.  The Machine lost the game to the Ohsweken Demons 19-13.  The Machine finished the 2012 campaign with a record of 6-8 which was good for fifth position in the six-team league.  The Machine did not qualify for the playoffs in 2012

The team was moved in the summer of 2012 and became the Toronto Shooting Stars. The Stars played in the old Maple Leaf Gardens, renamed the Mattamy Athletic Centre.  The Shooting Stars finished the regular season with a record of 8-6 which put them in a three-way tie with the Ohsweken Demons and the Brampton Inferno, now the SouthWest Cyclops.  Once the playoff matches were determined, the Shooting Stars found themselves in second spot and received a first-round bye.  In the semi-final, the Shooting Stars were able to defeat the Durham TurfDogs by the narrowest of margins by a score of 11-10.  This landed the Shooting Stars in the final against the Iroquois Ironmen.  In the final game, the Ironmen were able to eke past the Toronto squad by a score of 14-11 to take the Creators Cup.  

On November 8, 2013, new league owners decided to fold the Shooting Stars franchise taking the Canadian Lacrosse League to five teams.

Season-by-season record
Note: GP = Games played, W = Wins, L = Losses, T = Ties, OTL = Overtime losses, Pts = Points, GF = Goals for, GA = Goals against

References

External links
Official CLax website

Canadian Lacrosse League
Lacrosse teams in Ontario
Lacrosse teams in Toronto
Sport in Toronto
Lacrosse clubs established in 2011
2011 establishments in Ontario
Sports clubs disestablished in 2013
2013 disestablishments in Ontario